Malvin is a given name. Notable people with the name include:

 Malvin R. Anderson (1894-1986), American businessman and politician
 Malvin Gray Johnson (1896–1934), American painter
 Malvin Kamara (born 1983), English-born Sierra Leonean footballer
 Malvin Russell Goode, (1908–1995), American television journalist and news correspondent
 Malvin Wald (1917–2008), American screenwriter

See also
 Malvin (disambiguation)

Masculine given names